These hits topped the Dutch Top 40 in 1968.

See also
1968 in music

References

1968 in the Netherlands
1968 record charts
1968